Bob Prewitt (July 26, 1924 – May 3, 2018) was an American college basketball coach. He was the head coach at Southern Methodist University from 1967 to 1975.

Prewitt served in the Army Air Corps before enrolling at SMU in 1947. He served as team captain for the 1948-49 season, and was an All-Conference pick. Prewitt joined the coaching staff as an assistant in 1949 and helped the team to its first Final Four in 1956. In 1967, he became head coach, and led the team to a Southwest Conference regular-season title in 1972. He died on May 3, 2018, in Dallas, Texas at age 93.

References

1924 births
2018 deaths
American men's basketball coaches
American men's basketball players
Basketball coaches from Indiana
Basketball players from Indiana
College men's basketball head coaches in the United States
People from Columbus, Indiana
SMU Mustangs men's basketball coaches
SMU Mustangs men's basketball players